The Committee on Constitutional Affairs (AFCO) is a committee of the European Parliament dealing with institutional matters such as the Treaties of the European Union and the Parliament's rules of procedure. It is currently chaired by Salvatore De Meo MEP, an Italian member of the European People's Party parliamentary group.

References

External links
Official Homepage

Constitutional